Santa Maria di Piazza is a late-Baroque-style church located on via Santa Maria near Via Garibaldi in Central Turin, region of Piedmont, Italy. The church was among the last designs by Bernardo Vittone.

Description
The church was built between 1751-1752, originally along an elliptical plan with a complex dome, and consecrated in 1768 by the archbishop of Turin, Francesco Luserna Rorengo di Rorà The addition of two chapels in 1890 altered the layout to resemble more a Greek Cross. The sober neoclassical facade was designed by Barnaba Panizza and added in 1830.

Originally the church was affiliated with the Order of the Discalced Trinitarians, but later it was attached to the confraternities of the Santissimo Viatico and later the Sacro Cuore di Gesù (Holy Heart of Jesus). At the beginning of the 19th century it was affiliated with the Society of Saint Vincent de Paul. In 1910, the church was named a sanctuary and proclaimed a national monument.

Interior
The first altar on the right has an altarpiece depicting the Baptism of Christ by Michele Antonio Milocco, while the altar on the left has an altarpiece depicting the Holy Family by Mattia Franceschini. The main altarpiece depicts the Assumption of the Virgin by Pietro Francesco Guala.

References

Roman Catholic churches completed in 1752
18th-century Roman Catholic church buildings in Italy
Roman Catholic churches in Turin
Baroque architecture in Piedmont